Thisted Brewery (Danish: Thisted Bryghus) is a regional brewery in Thisted in the north of Denmark founded in 1902. The brewery supplies the local market with pilsner beer, and has gained recognition internationally for beers like Porse Guld (spiced with bog myrtle) and Limfjords Porter, a Baltic porter.

In 1995 Thisted Brewery was the first Danish brewer to introduce an organic beer.

Thisted Brewery was named the 2015 Brewery of the Year by the 9,000 members of the Danish beer enthusiasts association, Danske Ølentusiaster.

Twentieth century beer writer Michael Jackson wrote of Thisted's Limfjords Porter:
"It was full of character: a dense, brownish, head over a slatey, black, brew; full-bodied and lightly oily; a touch of burnt-grass, rooty, peatiness; a long, warming, finish; and an alcohol content of 7.9. The flavours were very complex, and I was not surprised to hear that both smoked malt and licorice were used."

In 2016 Thisted Brewery produced a "beer geek" version of Limfjords Porter in cooperation with international craft brewer, Mikkeller.

In 2019 the company invested 30 million kroner in a new brewery in Thisted.

References

External links
 Thisted-bryghus.dk. (official website)

Breweries in Denmark
Thisted
Danish companies established in 1902